The Coat of arms of Poltava Oblast is the official coat of arms of Poltava Oblast.

Description

The coat of arms consists of a shield divided into quarters by raspberry lozenge, crossed by argent and azure wavy belt.
In first azure part is gold paty cross.
 In second gold part is gules horseshoe.
 In third gold part is gules heart.
 In fourth azure part is gold wheat sheaf.
In first part of lozenge is gold bow, accompanied by two or stars, in second is gold gates with three towers, accompanied by two gold stars.
 Bow with arrow and stars are the elements which went into Poltava and Pyriatyn coats of arms, indicate on historic role the edges in defence of own earths, and also Poltava as administrative centre.
 Urban gates with three towers and flagpoles - element of coats of arms depicting the Trans-Sula Tower of Lokhvytsia fortress . It indicates on durability, power, edge inviolability, Cossack traditions.
 A water wave - element of Horishni Plavni, Kremenchuk, Lubny emblems, symbolizes riches of water spaces.
 A Cossack cross is symbol on historic colours of Poltava regiments and Myrhorod, Zinkiv, Karlivka, Kobeliaky emblems.
 A horseshoe is blown about element of patrimonial Ukraine coats of arms and is depicted on Karlivka, Karlivka Raion, Kozelshchyna Raion emblems - happiness symbol, good, love, consent.
 A heart is hetman coat of arms element of Pavlo Polubotok, Vasyl Kochubey, symbolises Poltavschyna as Ukraine heart, her grandeur, spirituality, - earth, beginning by mother country to prominent figures of world significance.
 Sheaf could be found on Hlobyne and Karlivka Raion emblems and personifies natural resource, earth's fertility, industry of its inhabitants, national traditions.
 A Crown is power, firmness, grandeur and glory.
Adopted colours:
 Raspberry - most blown about colour of Cossack colours - power, bravery.
 Azure means wrestling after freedom, hope.
 Or means sun, lightly, welfare, kindness, work, dignity.

History

External links
 A website on Ukrainian heraldry
 Another website with description of the Poltava Oblast coat of arms

Poltava
Poltava Oblast
Poltava Oblast
Poltava Oblast
Poltava Oblast
Poltava Oblast
Poltava Oblast
Poltava Oblast
Poltava Oblast